The 2012–13 Saint Joseph's Hawks  basketball team represented Saint Joseph's University during the 2012–13 NCAA Division I men's basketball season. The Hawks, led by 18th year head coach Phil Martelli, played their home games at Hagan Arena and were members of the Atlantic 10 Conference. They finished the season 18–14, 8–8 in A-10 play to finish in a three-way tie for the eighth place. They lost in the quarterfinals of the Atlantic 10 tournament to VCU. They were invited to the 2013 NIT where they lost in the first round to St. John's.

Roster

Schedule

|-
!colspan=9| Exhibition

|-
!colspan=9| Regular season

|-
!colspan=9| 2013 Atlantic 10 tournament

|-
!colspan=9| 2013 NIT

References

Saint Joseph's Hawks men's basketball seasons
Saint Joseph's
Saint Joseph's